James Kenyon may refer to:

James Kenyon (cinematographer) (1850–1925), businessman and pioneer of cinematography in Blackburn, England
James Kenyon (politician) (1846–1924), British Member of Parliament for Bury
James Kenyon (sport shooter) (1875–1935), Canadian Olympic sport shooter

Jimmy Kenyon (1888–1949), English footballer for Stockport County, Bradford Park Avenue, Glossop and Rochdale